Euretinae is a subfamily of glass sponges in the family Euretidae.

References

Hexactinellida
Sponge subfamilies